Widger is a surname. Notable people with the surname include:

Chris Widger (born 1971), American baseball player
Mike Widger (1948–2016), American player of Canadian football

See also
Widgery
Wiger